Star Princess may refer to one of the following ships:

 , in service with Princess Cruises between 1989 and 1997
 , in service with Princess Cruises between 2002 and 2020

Ship names